Rajshahi Railway Station is a railway station at Rajshahi, Bangladesh. The railway station is the main station of the city, and links to Dhaka via the Iswardi–Sirajganj line. The station is one of the most modern, largest and important stations of Bangladesh Railway along with Dhaka and Chittagong railway station. Headquarter of Western Zone of Bangladesh Railway is also located within the station complex.

History
In 1878, the railway route from Kolkata, then called Calcutta, to Siliguri was in two laps. The first lap was a 185 km journey along the Eastern Bengal State Railway from Calcutta Station (now Sealdah) to Damookdeah Ghat on the southern bank of the Padma River, then across the river in a ferry and the second lap of the journey.  A 336 km metre gauge line of the North Bengal Railway linked Saraghat on the northern bank of the Padma to Siliguri.

Kolkata-Siliguri main line was converted to broad gauge in stages. The Hardinge Bridge was opened in 1915, while Sara-Sirajganj line was constructed by the Sara-Sirajganj Railway Company in 1915–1916. Then in 1930 Abdulpur-Amnura broad gauge was opened as a branch from Sara-Sirajganj line. Rajshahi railway station was opened as a station of Abdulpur-Amnura branch line. The station terminal building, platform and yard was remodeled and revamped in 2003.

Infrastructure
The structure of Rajshahi railway station is like a bird from the front. In front of the main entrance of the station there is a large parking lot for cars and other vehicles. There are restrooms and ticket counters on the right side of the main platform. On the left, there is another lounge for male passengers, a railway inquiry, a food restaurant, a bookstore and two fast food outlets. What makes the platform different, is its specialized roof. Instead of the traditional concrete roof, the roof is covered with a few different types of plastic with a few triangular shaped parts.

The main building has 3 floors with a total of 6 platforms. There is a mosque on the second floor on the left and a residential hotel on the second and third floors. The platform can be entered through two entrances on either side of the railway station. Here is also another platform which is not directly connected with the main station build. Mostly local trains from Chapainawabganj/ Rohanpur stopped there. 
Train wash pits and carriage shops are located in the station yard. The wash pit is fully automatic.

Train services
Several trains from Rajshahi Railway Station to Dhaka, North Bengal and South Bengal run daily through this station. Four inter-city train services are operated by Bangladesh Railway, named "Silk City Express", "Padma Express" and "Dhumketu Express", and "Banalata Express" between Dhaka and Rajshahi regularly from this station. "Banalata Express", which is first ever non-stop train service on Dhaka-Rajshahi route connects this station with Dhaka and Chapainawabganj. "Barendra Express" and "Titumir Express" trains travel to Chilahati in the Nilphamari and "Banglabanha Express" to Panchagarh. 
"Kapotaksha Express", "Sagordari Express", "Tungipara Express" and "Madhumati Express" - these four trains travel to Khulna, Gopalganj in South Bengal and Bhanga in Faridpur District. Several mail trains like "Rajshahi Express", "Mohananda Express", "Uttara Express", "Rajshahi commuter" trains run daily to Dhaka, Khulna and different direction of Bangladesh. Apart from this, local trains of several routes including Ishwardi, Chapainawabganj also run regularly from this station. To transport Mango and other agricultural products a special parcel train "Mango Special" runs between the capital and Chapainawabganj through Rajshahi.

International freight trains passes through this station before/after transit between Rohanpur and Singhabad. International passenger train service from Rajshahi to Kolkata is expected to be inaugurated.

Timetable

Intercity trains

Mail/Express and mail trains

Commuter and shuttle trains

Goods trains

Gallery

See also

List of railway stations in Bangladesh

References

External links 

Railway stations in Rajshahi Division
Buildings and structures in Rajshahi Division
Rajshahi